Suspicion is a feeling of mistrust.

Suspicion(s), The Suspicion, or Suspicious may also refer to:

Film and television

Film
 Suspicion (1918 film), an American silent film directed by John M. Stahl
 Suspicion (1941 film), an American film noir directed by Alfred Hitchcock
 Suspicion (1982 film), a Japanese film directed by Yoshitaro Nomura
 Suspicions (film), a 2010 Canadian thriller film directed by Patrick Demers

Television
Series
 Suspicion (American TV series), a 1957–1958 mystery drama series
 Suspicion (2003 TV series), a British drama thriller series
 Suspicion (2022 TV series), a British thriller series

Episodes
 "Suspicion" (Code Lyoko: Evolution), 2013
 "Suspicion" (NCIS), 2007
 "Suspicion" (Stargate Atlantis), 2004
 "Suspicions" (Dynasty), 1986
 "Suspicions" (Star Trek: The Next Generation), 1993

Literature
 Suspicion (manga), a 1982 manga by Osamu Tezuka
 Suspicion (novel) (Der Verdacht), a 1951 novel by Friedrich Dürrenmatt
 Suspicion (Ce qui était perdu), a 1930 novel by François Mauriac
 Isaac Asimov's Robot City: Suspicion, a 1987 novel by Mike McQuay
 The Suspicion (novel), a 1998 Animorphs novel by K. A. Applegate

Music
 Suspicions (album), by Houston Person, 1980
 "Suspicion" (Les Paul song), 1948
 "Suspicion" (Terry Stafford song), originally recorded by Elvis Presley, 1962; released by Stafford, 1964
 "Suspicion" (R.E.M. song), 1999
 "Suspicions" (song), by Eddie Rabbitt, 1979; covered by Tim McGraw, 2007
 "Suspicion", a song by LP from Lost on You, 2016
 "Suspicion", a song by Richard Marx from My Own Best Enemy, 2004
 "Suspicious", a song by Ivy from All Hours, 2011

See also 

 Suspect (disambiguation)
 Under Suspicion (disambiguation)